The Ministry of Justice and Legal Affairs of Solomon Islands is a department of the government of the Solomon Islands.

List of ministers (1980-present)

Minister of Law and Information 

 Colin Gauwane (1979-1980)

Minister of Police and Justice 

 P. Keyaumi (1981-1983)
 Allan Qurusu (1984)
 Swanson C. Konofilia (1985-1988)
 Allan Kemakeza (1989-1990)
 Albert Laore (1991-1993)

Minister of Justice 

 Jackson Piasi (1993-1994)
 Oliver Zapo (1994-1996)
 Edmond Andresen Karaer (1998-2000)

Minister of Police, Justice & Legal Affairs 

 William Haomae (2000-2001) 
 Benjamin Una (2002)
 Augustine Taneko (2002-2004)
 Michael Maina (2004-2008)

Minister of Justice and Legal Affairs 

 Toswel Kaua (2008-2009)
 Laurie Chan (2009-2010)
 Commins Mewa (2010-2014)
 Ismael Avui (2015)
 William Marau (2015-2017)
 Derrick Manuari (2017–present)

See also 

 Justice ministry
 Politics of the Solomon Islands

References 

Justice ministries
Government of the Solomon Islands